The Sky's the Limit  is a 1938 British musical comedy film directed by Jack Buchanan and Lee Garmes and starring Buchanan, Mara Losseff and William Kendall.

It was made at Pinewood Studios.

Cast

References

Bibliography
 Low, Rachael. Filmmaking in 1930s Britain. George Allen & Unwin, 1985.
 Wood, Linda. British Films, 1927-1939. British Film Institute, 1986.

External links

1938 films
British musical comedy films
1938 musical comedy films
Films shot at Pinewood Studios
British black-and-white films
1930s English-language films
1930s British films